Lesley Horton is a British novelist and author of a series of crime novels featuring Bradford based Detective Inspector John Handford. Horton is a former schoolteacher who took early retirement in order to begin a career as a writer. She is also a past chair of the Crime Writers' Association.

Bibliography

 Snares of Guilt (2002)
 On Dangerous Ground (2003)
 Devils in the Mirror (2005)
 The Hollow Core (2006)
 Twisted Tracks (2007)

References

External links
 SHOTS magazine interview with Lesley Horton
 Profile of Lesley Horton
 Lesley Horton's website

Year of birth missing (living people)
Living people
English crime fiction writers